William Seay Moore (born December 31, 1990) known professionally as DJ Esco, is an American DJ, record producer, and record executive.

Career
A resident DJ at Magic City Mondays in Atlanta, Moore has worked as a DJ and A&R representative for rapper Future since meeting him in 2008. Future's mixtape 56 Nights was named after Moore's time spent in prison for marijuana possession in the United Arab Emirates. In 2016, Moore released the mixtape Project E.T., which features rappers such as Drake, Juicy J, and Lil Uzi Vert. On March 30, 2018, Moore released the album Kolorblind, featuring artists such as Schoolboy Q and Rich the Kid. The album includes previously released songs such as "Walk Thru" and "Code of Honor". Moore has served as an executive producer on Future's Hndrxx album.

Discography

Studio albums

Mixtapes

Singles

Awards and nominations

BET Hip Hop Awards

!
|-
| 2015
| rowspan="3" | Himself
| rowspan="2" | DJ of the Year
| rowspan="3" 
| 
|-
| 2017
| 
|-
| 2018
| Producer of the Year
| 
|}

References

1990 births
Living people
Musicians from Atlanta
African-American DJs
21st-century African-American people